Oleksandr Selivanov is a retired Ukrainian professional footballer who played as a defender.

Career
Oleksandr Selivanov, started his career with Cheksyl Chernihiv a club in Chernihiv without playing. In 1998 he moved to Desna Chernihiv in Ukrainian First League, here he managed to played 16 matches in the season 1998–99 but the club got relegated in Ukrainian Second League. In the season 1999–2000 he managed to play 13 matches and scored 2 goal and the club got 9th place in the league. In the season 2000–01 he got 2 place with the club and he managed to play 17 matches. He also played 10 matches with Yevropa Pryluky, then he returned to Desna Chernihiv without playing a single match. In summer 2002 he moved back to Yevropa Pryluky where he played 15 matches and 4 matches with FC Nizhyn. In 2003 he moved to Enerhetyk Burshtyn where he played only 1 match. In 2006 he moved to Avanhard Koryukivka without playing and in 2012 he played 1 match with LKT Chernihiv.

References

External links 
 Oleksandr Selivanov at footballfacts.ru

1977 births
Living people
Footballers from Chernihiv
FC Desna Chernihiv players
FC Cheksyl Chernihiv players
FC Enerhetyk Burshtyn players
FC Avanhard Koriukivka players
SDYuShOR Desna players
Ukrainian footballers
Ukrainian Premier League players
Ukrainian First League players
Ukrainian Second League players
Association football defenders